Live Rescue: Rewind (stylized as Live + Rescue: Rewind) is an American reality television spin-off of Live Rescue hosted by Matt Iseman.

Production
Live Rescue: Rewind highlights formerly aired episodes of Live Rescue and airs in the same format of Live PD: Rewind. Live Rescue episodes are edited down into segments and put together to air as one-hour episodes with commercials. No new footage is created specifically for the episodes although the series received its own title card. Matt Iseman continues to receive hosting credits for the episodes while Dan Flynn, Titus Tero, Sean "Sticks" Larkin, Tom Morris, Jr., Forest Smith, and Mike McCabe continue to receive analyst credits in the specific episodes they appear in.

Episodes

References

External links
 

2010s American reality television series
2020s American reality television series
2019 American television series debuts
English-language television shows
American television spin-offs
A&E (TV network) original programming
Live PD
Reality television spin-offs